Dale Alvin Gribble (born July 12, 1953) is a fictional character in the Fox animated series King of the Hill, voiced by Johnny Hardwick. He is an exterminator, bounty hunter, owner of Daletech, chain smoker, gun fanatic, and paranoid believer of almost all conspiracy theories and urban legends.

Production
Daniel Stern was originally offered the role of Dale Gribble but wasn't offered enough money. Stephen Root also  auditioned for the role, but later stated that "it didn't feel right." The role was eventually given to Johnny Hardwick.

Family
Dale had been estranged from his father, Bug Gribble, since he witnessed Bug kissing Dale's wife, Nancy, on the lips on their wedding day. In truth, Bug only kissed Nancy to hide his homosexuality as he was nearing a kiss with a Filipino caterer. When Dale entered the room, Bug, afraid of his son possibly rejecting him because of his sexuality, panicked and reached for the nearest female, not realizing that it was Nancy until the damage was done. Dale did not learn the truth until 20 years afterwards, when Hank, Dale, Boomhauer and Bill went to his father's gay rodeo to invite Bug to Dale's second wedding to Nancy. They find Bug and meet his lover, Juan-Pedro. Bug eventually reveals the truth to Dale and by the end of the episode Dale and Bug reconcile. Dale's mother is deceased, according to the episode "Bobby on Track."

Although highly suspicious of the government and of other people, Dale is unaware (although everyone else knows) that his wife Nancy had an affair with John Redcorn for nearly 15 years and that his son, Joseph (who strongly resembles Redcorn), is not his biological son. Dale never learned of the affair throughout the run of the series. The closest he has ever come to learning about it is in the episode where Peggy wanted to tell him, but she decided not to after seeing Dale and Joseph's relationship. John Redcorn even told Dale in the episode "Hank Gets Dusted" that he cheated with Hank's best friend's wife for 13 years, and Dale just thought he was talking about Bill's wife, Lenore; he never questioned what Redcorn said. This is apparently due in part to his blinding love for Nancy and his personal belief that John Redcorn might be "gay." An example of Dale's ignorance of Redcorn and Nancy's relationship occurs in one episode where he catches Redcorn sneaking through his bedroom window while Nancy was "sleeping" in their bed. When Redcorn, believing Dale had found out about his relationship with Nancy, sees this, he tells Dale he regrets him finding out in this way. Dale simply replies, "Get off my mower (Redcorn had jumped through the window by climbing onto Dale's lawn mower) and start massaging my wife," still in the belief that Redcorn was simply Nancy's masseur with the task of curing her false recurrent migraine headaches (forcing Redcorn to say in an exasperated tone that Dale was "taking some of the fun out of this"). Dale also discovers that Joseph shares a father with another child (a child fathered by John Redcorn, unbeknownst to Dale), but assumes this means both Joseph and the other child were the product of aliens inseminating earth women. A recurring gag early in the series was that whenever Dale would make a comment about being Joseph's father or being lucky enough to have a wife like Nancy, John Redcorn would show up.

In the episode "Vision Quest," Dale had a vision where he witnessed a faceless Native-American man wearing a lavish buffalo head-dress and other garb impregnating Nancy and then wound up in a hospital watching Nancy give birth to Joseph, who came out wearing exactly the same head-dress as the faceless Native American. He then tries to deduce that he himself must be Native-American. It is implied that Dale does know, but is simply in denial. Maybe he only sees what he wants to see. He remained as clueless as when his father tried to "come out" to Dale himself.

In contrast to the usually shallow demeanor he has towards his friends and people in general, Dale is fiercely devoted to his wife and son, and frequently displays his love for them. He blames himself for all of the problems Nancy herself caused between them while she was cheating on him, has an explicit (and misplaced) trust in her, and pampers her constantly; lavishing compliments, favors and gifts upon her, often in the embarrassing presence of John Redcorn. However, he never really showed much interest in spending personal time with her, and sometimes, usually in social situations, he would momentarily forget that he was married. Dale is extremely proud of Joseph, towards whom he is highly generous and supportive, especially for his athletic prowess and strong build, which Dale never possessed any of. Unlike Hank's demeanor with Bobby, Dale is extremely attentive to Joseph's needs and feelings, and is never afraid to express his affection for him. Although Dale's attempts at good parenting occasionally go astray due to his odd ideas, he is portrayed as Joseph's primary parent (especially in the earlier seasons when Nancy was still having an affair), and is usually the first person Joseph turns to when in trouble. Joseph, unlike Bobby, has very little conflict with his father and rarely seems to feel the need to rebel against him, probably due to Dale's emotional availability and acceptance of his son's activities and tendencies – an area in which he outshines Hank. While he is comfortable and unworried about his son's development, Dale is very protective of Joseph: despite his cowardly nature, he once rushed into what he believed was the tractor beam of an alien ship to save him, even though he was convinced that Joseph's real father was an alien.

Though as a father, Dale is often quite incompetent and misleading. When Joseph was caught smoking a cigarette with Bobby, Dale encouraged Joseph to consider taking smoking up as a habit as opposed to Bobby's parents who never wanted Bobby to smoke again. Dale sees Joseph fall in with some bad kids and pushes Joseph to be one of "the cool kids"—to the point of even breaking into a zoo together and encouraging him to kill an animal. Dale tries to get Joseph to go to a prep school for football, against even Joseph's own wishes, because of the bribes the school gives Dale including gift baskets and a paid up front 100 year extermination contract. He is always there for Joseph despite being inept and misguided. Even Dale admits his fatherly advice is "shoddy at best".

Lifestyle
Voice-over actor Johnny Hardwick has described Dale as fancying himself as a "William S. Burroughs" or "Jack Nicholson" type who thinks he knows all the angles. He believes most tabloid beliefs and urban legends, distrusting virtually every authority figure.

Dale is also seen to be a musician, with the electronic keyboard as his principal instrument. His resume includes a stint with the Propaniacs and the Dale Gribble Bluegrass Experience. He later becomes the manager of Big Mountain Fudgecak(e).

During the episode "The Texas Skillsaw Massacre," it is revealed Dale also cares for and raises show turtles; Dale was seen polishing a turtle using Turtle Wax and a handheld electric buffer. He also keeps other creatures, especially different kinds of bugs, in the basement.

When the chemicals he used to kill rats (as well as a lifetime of smoking) forced Dale to briefly give up his job due to him passing out from the gas, he took a position as a corporate hatchet-man and was spectacularly good at firing people, but his action to deal with a roach infestation (which he caused inadvertently) at this job led him to return to extermination where he successfully killed every roach without the use of poisons. Dale's favorite TV shows are Sanford and Son and What's Happening!!. He enjoys drinking Alamo Beer with Hank, Bill, and Boomhauer. Dale is an avid smoker (since third grade) of Manitoba brand cigarettes, most likely a parody of Marlboro cigarettes, and also drinks Mountain Dew (which he once asked Nancy to boil). In the episode "Dale Be Not Proud," Dale tells a boy receiving his kidney that the kidney likes Mountain Dew, and to give it a can once a week. He also stockpiled two  pressurized drums of Mountain Dew in preparation for Y2K in the episode "Hillennium." In the same episode, he attempted to breed "gerbster," a combination of hamster and gerbil for fresh meat during Y2K (he had thought that the breeding pair were gerbils, but Nancy had pointed out that one was a hamster).

Dale's paranoid nature extends to his home and family. He has coded scenarios should he ever come under threat (no matter how absurd or unlikely), albeit Nancy is oblivious to the exact nature of the scenario. His own home is rigged with various security and surveillance features; how he can afford them is uncertain as Nancy is the superior earner. He once rigged Hank's and his own mailbox to explode via the television remote. His rear sliding door features a backup grille style door (the kind found in shopping mall stores) to keep out intruders; his front door features a full metal roll-down door, while the porch lights serve as klaxons, which were put in use when the real Rusty Shackleford paid a visit (see below). His bathroom is accessible via keypad lock as is access to the basement. Dale's basement is his principal "headquarters." One episode indicates he has a perimeter encompassing security cameras and motion detectors that respond in his own voice. His living room TV is rigged like a video phone. He records all his phone conversations but does not allow callers to record their calls to him themselves. He owns surplus Soviet night vision goggles and eavesdropping listeners. Yet for all his documentation of goings-on, he has never deduced Nancy has been committing adultery with John Redcorn and Joseph is the product of their love.

Perhaps owing to the research he has conducted as a conspiracy theorist, Dale has a thorough knowledge of the workings of the American government, the legal system, the BEAST (computer conspiracy), and bureaucracy. He has used this knowledge to assist his friends, both to help Hank with problems related to renewing his driver's license when a clerical error changes his gender, and to help John Redcorn with his land claim and lawsuit against the American government. Dale's help for Hank in that instance came about after he realized the Warren Commission report was accurate and became obnoxiously patriotic, to the point of painting a huge American flag on Hank's house (without enough stars on it) and trying to turn Hank into the Department of Homeland Security after he tried to remove it. However, he has a habit of horribly misconstruing information, having misunderstood a placebo (a fake drug, usually sugar or colored water) for a top-secret government research project and Hank for cleaning off the paint he put on Hank's roof as "defacing an American flag" in the aforementioned case. A running gag throughout the series is Dale's attempt (denied 6 times according to Hank) to construct his own guard tower in his front yard. In the episode "Flush with Power" he appealed to the zoning board for such permission only to be denied. He was later granted permission by a corrupt politician; to do so if he helped blackmail Hank (who also served on the board) which Hank promptly tore up when Dale confessed. In the episode "Life: A Loser's Manual" Dale orders aluminum rails to finally build his tower. To avoid county laws, using his knowledge of loopholes, he constructed the tower with reduced dimensions the county had no authority to condemn (Regulations come into effect if the structure exceeds 100 square feet and exceeds 40 feet in height) at 39 feet high. However, the lack of a foundation caused it to collapse.

Dale stands at 6'0" and shares a birthday with Van Cliburn (July 12). He is believed to have been born around 1953, as he was in the same grade as Hank in school, and Hank is revealed to have been born in 1953 in the episodes "Order of the Straight Arrow" and "Hank's Dirty Laundry". He is almost never seen without his signature Mack cap and prescription eyeglasses with sunglass lenses on a hinge (even indoors and in the shower), except on rare occasions where he is forced to remove them, as seen in the episode where he worked at a sticky notes business as a human resources director and had to adhere to a corporate dress code. He wears his cap and glasses indoors at all times, even at funerals. He always wears his hat because he is very sensitive about his hair loss. He has brown eyes and a slightly raspy voice.

He often gets caught up in his (usually far-fetched and extreme) conspiracy theories, which can sometimes cause him to be very selfish or double-cross his friends (particularly Hank), although in the end he usually sees sense and comes to the aid of his friends. His schemes also tend to run out of steam or collapse; he bought a low-power radio transmitter, and launched his own talk station "serving the entire tri-house area" Art Bell-style, but soon ran out of things to talk about on the air. (He later indicated that "Dale's Dead Bug," of which he is the owner and sole employee, was offended by things he said on air. He sold the transmitter to "Mexican interests" – namely, his friend, Octavio.) He also puts out an irregular newsletter titled "The Gribble Report," and was once asked by Hank not to send it to his father Cotton.

His trademark line is "Shi-shi-shi-shaa-haa," usually heard too fast to phonetically understand, and he says it whenever he is impressed with himself carrying out a plan or when springing a sudden move of his own brand of "martial arts". He also exclaims "Wingo!" when excited and "That's a Gribble of an idea!" when someone thinks of a solution to his problems. He's also known for exclaiming "S'go, s'go!" (a contraction of "Let's go") when rushed or excited and "G'h!" when he is startled or learns something that feeds into his paranoid nature. When apprehended, he is quick to give up his accomplices.

In the episode "Tankin' It to the Streets," Dale claims to have completed a Russian correspondence course and can speak the language, in this episode he is heard reciting perfect Russian as is done in one other episode "Nancy does Dallas"  though his application of this in handling an Abrams M1A2 tank isn't exactly flawless (having flattened Kahn's new SUV, or, as Hank put it, "hit a curb"). In "Night and Deity," moreover, Dale is further shown to have some competency in Tagalog.

While Dale is boastful and often outgoing in his schemes, he invariably turns into a coward at the slightest sight of trouble, such as when he and Bobby attempt to steal the rival school's mascot (and subsequently retreats back to Tom Landry Middle School when they realize that their mascot costume isn't protected), Dale takes off the second Bobby tells him of the incoming students from the rival school, leaving Bobby behind (Dale heads off to tell Hank so that the latter may go and save Bobby). However, he openly admits that he completely trusts his friends (particularly Hank), even more than himself, and in cases where he does realize the full impact of his actions, he can be surprisingly self-sacrificing. When he and his friends became volunteer firemen, he secretly switched his full oxygen tank with Hank's low-running one just before putting out a fire. On another occasion, in order to save Bobby from a swarm of fire ants, he intentionally transferred them to his own body and allowed them to all bite him at the same time, an action that nearly killed him. He also saved the guys from a crazed member of the gun club claiming to be a member of the CIA. Dale also typically comes to wrong conclusions about actual events; a running gag in the show is Dale being unaware of Nancy cheating on him, despite walking in on her and John Redcorn. Moreover, he typically thinks most events that occur to him are motivated, malicious acts against him and not accidents, such as when Hank cuts off Dale's finger by accident using his circular saw and Dale becomes convinced that Hank meant to injure him. In actuality, it was Dale who carelessly put his finger in front of the blade.

He is also a keen baker, as referenced in numerous episodes. He cooks and cleans as his wife is the one with a full-time job and she personally pays most of the bills for the family. Nancy has him on an allowance. He reads a lot of romance novels.

Smoking
Dale heavily smokes (admitting to have been smoking for 30 years) Manitoba brand cigarettes. Manitoba cigarettes are the official (fictional) brand of the Royal Canadian Mounted Police. According to a high ranking Manitoba president, Dale should have died by now, having smoked over 991,863 cigarettes (essentially 90 cigarettes per day), enough to earn every item in the Manitoba catalog. Dale uses Zippo lighters, visible whenever he lights up. He has been smoking since third grade. Dale remembers when Hank was a smoker and even is thrilled when Hank re-lapses. When he hears that Joseph was caught smoking a cigarette (Dale's own brand of Manitoba 100), Dale is proud and encourages Joseph to read a pro-smoking endorsing book from the Manitoba corporation.

Dale reveals that he doesn't know what to do with his hands and is consequently a heavy smoker ("Of Mice and Little Green Men"). This is also proven when he runs back for his cigarettes, despite the fact that a bomb that he created is armed. He once attempted to quit smoking and switched to chewing tobacco, but when his wife prohibited spitting in their house, he started packing the tobacco into a rolled newspaper and inhaling the fumes, which proved fruitless. Boomhauer lit the newspaper and Dale crowned him a genius. Dale also once reacted to a cigarette being taken out of his mouth by screeching "My oral fixation!" ("Torch Song Hillogy"). Dale has been smoking since the 3rd grade (with the same brand). This could be traced back to the fact that in elementary school Dale had social acceptance issues. When heavy rain caused flooding, Dale, fearing a Noah's ark type of flood, tapes a cigarette to one of his turtles and tells him to find dry land and plant it. When preparing for Y2K, he stockpiled numerous cartons of cigarettes, and during a trip to Mexico he is shown to have taped several packs of cigarettes to his chest in order to carry them back across the US border. He also keeps a single cigarette and match in a plastic bag under his hat as his last "smoke" for when he thinks he will soon die, which he has used once before when he thought he would die out at sea.

Physical abilities
Dale's physical frailty and lack of athletic abilities is a running gag. While his friends were athletes in high school on the football team, he was the towel manager. When the Arlen Longhorns had their big rematch with the Mustangs years later, Dale was allowed to play on the field with the football players themselves. He helped them win the big game.

Hank states that Dale can only bench press  and that he has proven he can "kick Dale's ass" while standing on a ladder. He also is incapable of performing a single pull-up. Dale admits that a prepubescent girl would probably beat him in a fight and that he doesn't know where his son got his athletic abilities — being unaware that John Redcorn is Joseph's biological father. During an altercation with Bill, Kahn describes him as an "anorexic chain smoker." Dale confirms the possibility that he may suffer from an eating disorder, when, in season three episode "Dog Dale Afternoon," Dale mentions "the binging, the purging," indicating that he suffers from bulimia, not anorexia, although this was while Dale was becoming more paranoid than usual. Dale also has very little stamina; Bobby is shown to easily power walk faster than Dale can run over a very short distance. He seems to have an advanced immunity to poisons and toxins; having been smoking for 30 years. When the police mistook him for an armed gunman, they fired tear gas, to which he suffered no ill effect, claiming, "I use stronger than this to kill squirrels."

He is remarkably scrawny with a slight beer gut. Despite his physical shortcomings, Dale claims to have "catlike reflexes," which he credits as the cause of any and all physical feats. Dale has excellent flexibility — which Nancy is said to enjoy —(we see him doing very advanced Yoga) and also claims to be an expert in the fictitious martial art "Monkey Style." Oddly enough, Dale is a phenomenal competitive eater. In season 7, he spontaneously enters a hot dog eating contest, claiming, "Any idiot can eat hot dogs; it's not a talent." Moments later, Dale is repeatedly eating three hot dogs at a time — "tri-dogging." Dale ate  hot dogs and temporarily became a "gurgitator" or competitive eater. He is surprisingly agile to the point he managed to hop a fence to retain evidence until the police arrived to arrest the perpetrator. He's a capable knife thrower, but he has bad marksmanship.

Being physically weak, even describing himself as a "coward," Dale relies on trying to outsmart his adversaries. Dale routinely spends hours in his basement studying his friends and enemies via the surveillance equipment he has installed around his property. He usually comes up with elaborate revenge plots that typically fail. However, on occasion Dale does succeed in his scheming, such as when he was able to overthrow the president of the Gun Club to become the new president of the club by bluffing that he was a CIA officer.

Gun ownership
Dale owns a countless number of guns. He was at one point the president of the Arlen Gun Club several terms in a row (simply because he had the most guns, according to Hank). In one episode when Peggy opened a bookstore, Dale stated that he "literally has oodles of guns" and started selling them in the back of the store, complete with a firing range. Dale (like the rest of the gun club) is a bad shot. He becomes a somewhat better shot when Minh joins the club and teaches the guys to "open their eyes and aim when they shoot." Dale resigns as president so Minh can take the rank of President. He is capable of throwing a knife, but his aim is once again lacking.

Political views
Dale is highly suspicious of all levels of government and ardently defends his Second Amendment rights, once remarking, "Guns don't kill people; the government does." He is either libertarian or conservative. Dale also refuses to pay taxes, does not vote at all ("The Perils of Polling"), and occasionally prints his own currency (Hank Hill typically appearing on the Hundred-Gribble bill, according to Hank in "Mega-Lo Dale"). He runs away and sweats a lot when the IRS comes knocking on his door. In the episode "Movin' On Up," he refused to give Hank his social security number so the quartet of friends could rent a house on the block to use as a clubhouse. In another episode, he believed the government had tested "deadly placebo drugs" on Bill, supposedly made by "Puh-fizer" in order to create a group of super soldiers that could survive Arctic conditions to repel the Soviets in case of invasion via the North Pole. Despite his passionate dislike of Government, he has received welfare from unemployment offices under his alias "Rusty Shackleford." In one story arc, Dale went on a tour of the sites involved in the assassination of John F. Kennedy to confirm his conspiracy theories, but when he finally read the entire part of a key FBI report on it he realized that the government had been telling the truth and that his entire worldview was ruptured; Dale then became even more annoying as a true-patriot than he'd been a dissident (he tried to turn Hank in to the FBI and Homeland Security after even the normally patriotic Hank got sick of Dale's pro-government bragging) but used his newfound respect for the Federal government to get an obnoxious DMV employee to immediately correct Hank Hill's new driver's license after it had listed him as female and gave bureaucratic excuses for not changing it. When it was revealed the US government made a mistake, Dale was forced to realize that anglicizing nor vilifying the government was the answer and he has to think for himself.

Dale's Dead Bug
Dale is a self-employed exterminator. Different episodes portray his abilities in the field as anywhere from very poor to quite good, although he is always dedicated to his job. He seems to have great passion, but all this is merely to overcompensate for his lack of talent at this. He has mentioned that his own lack of skill results in several repeat customers. He idolizes other, more professional exterminators whom he gets to work with such as Shelia in the episode "Night and Deity" and Tommy and Rollo in "SerPUNT." Dale, whether described as good or bad at his job, actually makes very little money from the business. He states that he doesn't "make a living wage," we see that he has a job weekly spraying Hank's lawn for $2. He doesn't pay any taxes or bills, with the exception of the cable bill. Instead, Nancy financially supports the family, giving Dale an allowance like a child for doing chores. He sometimes fights for a raise, to no avail. Also, in the episode "De-Kahnstructing Henry," he receives an unemployment check under his alias, Rusty Shackleford (who was a kid from his childhood who he thought had died, but who had merely moved away) which may or may not be a recurring tactic. From these two or three sources of income, Dale always seems to be able to pay for what he needs and to fund his various projects.

Dale runs his own extermination business, Dale's Dead-Bug, although he generally does not pay taxes on his income and has filled out an income tax form only once. He works entirely solo. It is hinted that he is not professionally trained in extermination and that his business is not a legally operating firm in the United States, as his company checks read "Dales Dead Bug - A Liberian Registered Company." He drives a white Dodge Caravan nicknamed "the Bug-ebago", combining "bug" and "Winnebago" with a large plastic queen ant sculpture perched on the roof. The ant, which can be rotated to appear dead (legs up) or alive (legs down), was a group project of Dale and friends/neighbors Hank Hill, Bill Dauterive and Jeff Boomhauer to help them over the emotional turmoil they shared over the death of actor Hervé Villechaize. Later on, Dale ends up buying a worn out and non-running Hyundai Excel claimed to be owned by former Dallas Cowboy Deion Sanders from another former Cowboy and Super Bowl champion, "Big Willie Lane."

Dale is not an especially good exterminator. He's not even licensed. He remarks his incompetence thankfully allows a lot of "repeat business". When Lucky brought a snake into the house for Bobby and Hank wanted Dale to deal with it, Dale didn't really do anything as he remarked the boa was an "alpha" while Dale was clearly a "beta snake". He compensates for his lack of skill at pest control by working very cheap.

On different occasions, he has attempted to kill a groundhog by throwing grenades down its various holes and has nearly killed himself while trying to kill a single cornered rat. He does, however, uncover that teenagers were pestering the local Mega-lo Mart rather than the rats everyone else believed, in the process also discovering Chuck Mangione was living in the store. He also saves his office workplace at Stik-Tek from an accidental, self-caused roach infestation.

Relationship with Peggy Hill
While Dale is generally suspicious of, and rude to, most people, he seems to have a particular dislike of Hank's wife, Peggy. He regularly makes insults behind her back (usually about her appearance) to Hank's face, and makes no real attempt to hide it from anyone. When recalling Peggy's ruined birthdays (flash floods, food poisoning, armed robbery, etc.), Hank states that Dale is the only person who enjoys her birthday (due to the misery it causes her). Dale even gleefully ruins her birthday murder mystery entertainment and makes every attempt to further worsen the situation just to make her feel worse. But even he feels bad when her latest birthday is a complete train wreck. He states that he finds Kahn's insults toward Peggy "amusing." Dale states that he has simply "run out of things to say to that woman (Peggy)."

He finds her unattractive, arrogant, incompetent and quite dull. And "crazy" in the episode "To Spank With Love." Dale also seems to be well aware of, and annoyed by, Peggy's highly inflated ego and simply wishes to knock her down a peg. Despite all of this, he and Peggy tend to work very well together in a business-like fashion. In the episode "Peggy's Gone to Pots," they work together to fake their own deaths. After failing to drive Bill's car off a cliff with Dale and Peggy mannequins inside, Dale pulls a pistol and puts a bullet in the head of Peggy's doll, perhaps symbolic of how much he dislikes her. Despite this, Dale and Peggy collaborate amiably in "Hank's Bully," when they enter a taxidermy contest together, as well as the episode "Full Metal Dustjacket," where Peggy owns a bookstore that Dale sells guns out of. In the episode "The Exterminator", Dale, waking up in the hospital and disappointed with Hank notifying Nancy, designates Peggy as his emergency contact. In "Nancy Boys," after going on many couple dates that is reconciling Dale and Nancy's strained marriage, Peggy tells Hank that if he and Dale were to ever switch wives with each other, the clear winner would be Dale, indicating that she considers herself more attractive than Nancy. Peggy seems to have significantly more respect for Dale than he does for her. She attempts to be the one to tell Dale of Nancy's infidelities and of Hank's harboring Dale's temporarily stolen lawn-mower. She also brain-storms a way to regain his self-worth after he humiliates and disgraces him in front of the Arlen Gun Club.

Rusty Shackleford
Due to his beliefs, he uses the alias Rusty Shackleford whenever he doesn't want his real name known, mostly when ordering pizza. However, Dale inevitably reveals his identity anyway after a few minutes through one act of stupidity or another, such as using the two names interchangeably with the same person.

Dale has claimed to have the birth certificate of a child who died in 1953 with the name Rusty Shackleford. It is not known whether this document is real or fake. The only two documents he has ever signed with his real name were the neighbourhood block charter and a Mega-lo-Mart club card application by accident; he refuses to sign any document authorized by a government official. Along with the alias, he often wears a false handlebar mustache to "tighten" his security.

In the episode "Peggy's Gone to Pots", Rusty Shackleford is revealed to be a real person after showing up on Dale's doorstep. He had come to see Dale because of some medical documents that were filled out and never paid in his name. He tries to tell Dale that he had never actually died and had simply moved, but Dale immediately flees out of fear that Rusty had come to hurt him and his family. This forced Rusty Shackleford to remain in the neighborhood for the course of a few days searching for Dale and in the end, all he had wanted was a signature.

Dale used the alias of Central American singing sensation Lamotil when he was in Mexico for the elections in the episode "The Perils of Polling".

In the episode "Bystand Me", Dale used the alias of teenager Sparky Wilson when applying for a newspaper delivery job.

References

External links
Official site for King of the Hill
Official bio (archived page; retrieved April 14, 2009)

Television characters introduced in 1997
Animated characters introduced in 1997
Fictional bounty hunters
Fictional radio personalities
King of the Hill characters
Fictional characters from Texas
Male characters in animated series